Richard Gasson (1842 – September 29, 1864) was an American soldier who fought in the American Civil War. Gasson posthumously received his country's highest award for bravery during combat, the Medal of Honor. Gasson's medal was won for his actions during the Battle of Chaffin's Farm in Henrico County, Virginia on September 29, 1864. Gasson was killed during the battle. He was honored with the award on June 22, 1896.

Gasson was born in Ireland, and his registered home was in New York City at the time of the civil war.

Medal of Honor citation

See also
 List of American Civil War Medal of Honor recipients: G–L

References

1842 births
1864 deaths
19th-century Irish people
American Civil War recipients of the Medal of Honor
Irish-born Medal of Honor recipients
Irish emigrants to the United States (before 1923)
Military personnel from New York City
People of Massachusetts in the American Civil War
Union Army officers
Union military personnel killed in the American Civil War
United States Army Medal of Honor recipients